James Seay (September 9, 1914 – October 10, 1992) was an American character actor who often played minor supporting roles as government officials.

Early years
Seay demonstrated an interest in acting at an early age, as he and his mother regularly attended Saturday matinees of a stock theater company in Pasadena, California. After working for an insurance company, he became a student at the Pasadena Playhouse.

Career
After a year at the Pasadena Playhouse, Seay spent the summer as leading man in a summer stock company at the Chapel Playhouse in Guilford, Connecticut. He returned to Pasadena and performed in two plays before he received a contract from Paramount He played a doctor in an "old folks home" in the film Miracle on 34th Street (1947).

Among his many credits, Seay appeared in minor roles in a couple of episodes of Adventures of Superman television series:  The Mind Machine (as a senator) and Jungle Devil (as an airplane pilot).

In the syndicated 1954-1955 television series Stories of the Century, Seay portrayed the Wyoming storekeeper James "Jim" Averill, companion of Cattle Kate Watson, both of whom were hanged in a dispute with cattlemen at the start of the Johnson County Range War.

Seay played corrupt district attorney Lucius Peck in the 1955 episode, "The Hangman Waits" on the western anthology series, Death Valley Days.

Seay appeared sixteen times as Judge Spicer on ABC's western series, The Life and Legend of Wyatt Earp. He was cast six times as a sheriff on the NBC children's western series, Fury. He also guest starred in the syndicated aviation adventure series, Whirlybirds, and on the westerns The Californians, The Tall Man, and The Rebel.

He appeared three times in 1958 and 1959 on CBS' Perry Mason: murder victim Ross Hollister in "The Case of the Cautious Coquette," Dr. Michael Harris in "The Case of the Curious Bride," and murderer Ralph Hibberly in "The Case of the Spurious Sister."

Seay was cast as Duke Tavener, an unscrupulous businessman who tries to force a woman to turn over her saloon/casino to him, in the 1958 episode "Gambler" of the ABC/Warner Brothers western series, Cheyenne.

He appeared on CBS's The Twilight Zone as the sheriff in the episode "In His Image" and as Agent Bowton in The Andy Griffith Show Season 4 episode, "The Haunted House" and the Season 5 episode, "Prisoner of Love".  In 1960 he appeared on Bat Masterson.

Seay made training films for the United States Army Air Forces during World War II.

Death
On October 10, 1992, Seay died in Laguna Beach, California.

Selected filmography

 Back Door to Heaven (1939) - Juror (uncredited)
 Emergency Squad (1940) - Slim - Buller's Chauffeur (uncredited)
 Women Without Names (1940) - O'Grane
 Opened by Mistake (1940) - Sam Peters (uncredited)
 Those Were the Days! (1940) - Andrews
 The Way of All Flesh (1940) - Varno
 Queen of the Mob (1940) - Eddie Webster
 Golden Gloves (1940) - Jimmy
 Oklahoma Renegades (1940) - Carl
 I Want a Divorce (1940) - Young Intern (uncredited)
 North West Mounted Police (1940) - Constable Fenton
 The Son of Monte Cristo (1940) - Lt. Stone
 Flight Command (1940) - Officer on Downed Seaplane (uncredited)
 Love Thy Neighbor (1940) - Boat Attendant (uncredited)
 The Green Hornet Strikes Again! (1940, Serial) - Bordine - a Gangster
 The Face Behind the Mask (1941) - Jeff Jeffries
 The Mad Doctor (1941) - Intern (uncredited)
 Meet Boston Blackie (1941) - Mechanical Man
 In Old Colorado (1941) - Hank Merritt
 Power Dive (1941) - Army Radio Operator (uncredited)
 Two in a Taxi (1941) - Cristy Reardon
 Flying Blind (1941) - Dave - Flight Dispatcher
 The Kid from Kansas (1941) - Lee Walker
 Mr. Celebrity (1941) - Jim Kane
 Keep 'Em Flying (1941) - Lieutenant (uncredited)
 They Died with Their Boots On (1941) - Lt. Walsh (uncredited)
 Dangerously They Live (1941) - Carl
 Man from Cheyenne (1942) - Sheriff Jim
 Ride 'Em Cowboy (1942) - Jack - Ranger Captain (uncredited)
 Joe Smith, American (1942) - Roy, Aircraft Plant Worker (uncredited)
 Tramp, Tramp, Tramp (1942) - Biggie Waldron
 Home in Wyomin' (1942) - Tex Harrison
 Ten Gentlemen from West Point (1942) - Courtney (uncredited)
 Eagle Squadron (1942) - Medical Officer (uncredited)
 Flight Lieutenant (1942) - Lt. Anderson (uncredited)
 Enemy Agents Meet Ellery Queen (1942) - Marine Sgt. Stevens
 Timber (1942) - Joe Radway
 Highways by Night (1942) - Westbrook, the Man with Trucks
 Time to Kill (1942) - Leslie Murdock (uncredited)
 Ridin' Down the Canyon (1942) - Burt Wooster
 Flight for Freedom (1943) - Naval Lieutenant (uncredited)
 Learn and Live (1943) - Joe Instructor (uncredited)
 Resisting Enemy Interrogation (1944) - Capt. James N. Spencer (uncredited)
 B-29 Flight Engineer (1944) - Pilot (uncredited)
 Home, Sweet Homicide (1946) - Frank Riley (uncredited)
 Miracle on 34th Street (1947) - Dr. Pierce (uncredited) 
 Heartaches (1947) - Lt. Dan Armstrong, Homicide
 Secret Beyond the Door (1947) - Bob Dwight
 T-Men (1947) - Hardy - Treasury Lab Tech. (uncredited)
 Slippy McGee (1948) - Thomas Eustis
 The Cobra Strikes (1948) - Police Capt. Monihan
 The Checkered Coat (1948) - Capt. Dunhill
 An Innocent Affair (1948) - Lester Burnley
 The Strange Mrs. Crane (1948) - Mark Emery
 I Cheated the Law (1949) - Rodd Simpson
 Red Canyon (1949) - Joel Creech
 Prejudice (1949) - Minister
 Life of St. Paul Series (1949) - Barnabas
 Military Academy with That Tenth Avenue Gang (1950) - Maj. Norcross
 The Asphalt Jungle (1950) - Officer Janocek (uncredited)
 Union Station (1950) - Detective Eddie Shattuck
 Revenue Agent (1950) - Narrator (uncredited)
 The Flying Missile (1950) - Lt. Jackson (uncredited)
 Hunt the Man Down (1950) - Prosecutor (uncredited)
 Charlie's Haunt (1950) - Boss (uncredited)
 Fury of the Congo (1951) - Narrator (voice, uncredited)
 Up Front (1951) - Lt. Ferguson (uncredited)
 When the Redskins Rode (1951) - George Washington
 Strictly Dishonorable (1951) - Lili's Attorney (uncredited)
 When Worlds Collide (1951) - Donovan (uncredited)
 The Day the Earth Stood Still (1951) - Government Man (uncredited)
 Close to My Heart (1951) - Everett C. Heilner / Edward C. Hewitt
 Models Inc. (1952) - Det. Sgt. Mooney
 Brave Warrior (1952) - Gov. William Henry Harrison
 Voodoo Tiger (1952) - Abel Peterson
 Torpedo Alley (1952) - Skipper
 Off Limits (1952) - Maj. Evans, MD (uncredited)
 The Homesteaders (1953) - John Kroger
 Problem Girls (1953) - Max Thorpe
 Jack McCall, Desperado (1953) - Bat McCall
 The War of the Worlds (1953) - Air Force Bomber Pilot (uncredited)
 Fort Ti (1953) - Mark Chesney
 Phantom from Space (1953) - Major Andrews
 Son of Belle Starr (1953) - George Clark
 Sea of Lost Ships (1953) - Executive Officer (uncredited)
 Captain John Smith and Pocahontas (1953) - Edward Maria Wingfield
 Killers from Space (1954) - Col. Banks
 Captain Kidd and the Slave Girl (1954) - The Earl of Bellomont
 Return to Treasure Island (1954) - Felix Newman
 Vera Cruz (1954) - Abilene
 The Steel Cage (1954) - Dr. Perry (segment "The Hostages")
 Kiss Me Deadly (1955) - FBI Agent #2
 The Kentuckian (1955) - Riverboat Gambler (uncredited)
 I Died a Thousand Times (1955) - Man in Tropico Lobby (uncredited)
 At Gunpoint (1955) - Townsman in Saloon (uncredited)
 I've Lived Before (1956) - Fred Bolan (uncredited)
 Gun Brothers (1956) - Blackjack Silk
 Friendly Persuasion (1956) - Rebel Captain (uncredited)
 Man in the Vault (1956) - Paul De Camp
 The Big Land (1957) - Ben Rummert (uncredited)
 Beginning of the End (1957) - Capt. James Barton
 Man of a Thousand Faces (1957) - Casting Director (uncredited)
 The Amazing Colossal Man (1957) - Col. Hallock
 Pal Joey (1957) - Livingston (uncredited)
 Bombers B-52 (1957) - B-52 School Instructor (uncredited)
 Flood Tide (1958) - Doctor (uncredited)
 Street of Darkness (1958) - Jesse Flores
 The Buccaneer (1958) - Creole Militia Officer
 Official Detective (1958, TV Series, US series - Episode: "Extortion") - Cracker
 The Threat (1960) - Harry Keenan
 The Lawbreakers (1961) - Mayor Harold Emshaw (archive footage)
 Secret of Deep Harbor (1961) - Travis
 What Ever Happened to Baby Jane? (1962) - Police Officer #3
 Brainstorm (1965) - Judge at Scavenger Hunt (uncredited)
 First to Fight (1967) - Speaker at Bond Rally (uncredited)
 The Ballad of Josie (1967) - Territorial Politician (uncredited)
 The Destructors (1968) - Sec. of Defense
 Panic in the City (1968) - Pitt
 The Green Berets (1968) - Soldier (uncredited)
 There Was a Crooked Man... (1970) - Aide to Lieutenant Governor (uncredited)

Selected Television

References

External links
 

1914 births
1992 deaths
20th-century American male actors
American male television actors
American male film actors
Male actors from Pasadena, California